Greek National Road 89 is a road in East Attica, Greece. It connects Gerakas with Sounio, via Koropi and Lavrio. Between Gerakas and Koropi it has lost importance after the opening of the Motorway 6. There are plans to upgrade the section between Koropi and Lavrio to motorway standards, by constructing junctions to replace the traffic lights and generally upgrading the road. This new road will carry the designation A61.

Route

According to the Government Gazette in 1963, the EO89 runs from Stavros (near Gerakas) to Sounio, via Lavrio. The present alignment of the EO89 bypasses Koropi, Markopoulo, Keratea, although the original route ran through these settlements: in addition, the original alignment ran from Keratea to Lavrio via the hamlet of Plaka, instead of Dipseliza. The road continues to run through Glyka Nera and Paiania, as the A6 bypasses them.

The route currently has connections with:
 The EO54 at Stavros (Gerakas)
 The A6 and A62 at separate junctions near Koropi
 The EO85 at Keratea
 The EO91 at Sounio

References

Further information

89
Roads in Attica
Streets in Athens